The 2012–13 Belgian Elite League was the 76th season of the Belgian Elite League, the top flight men's rugby union league in Belgium. The season saw the return of the Liegeois rugby club Coq Mosan, who were relegated to 2nd division after the 2010-2011 season. They managed to evade relegation by beating the rugby club BUC from Evere, who were relegated instead. The Championship was claimed by ASUB Rugby Waterloo who won their first Championship title since 1998.

Season table

{| class="wikitable" width="450px" style="float:left; font-size:95%; margin-left:15px;"
| colspan="2"  style="text-align:center; background:#fff;" cellpadding="0" cellspacing="0"|Key to colours
|-
| style="background: #3fff00;" |     
| Champions
|-
| style="background:#ccf;"|     
|Participants in Championship Playoffs
|-
| style="background: #ff79B4;" |     
|Bottom team is relegated to Division 2.
|}

Championship playoffs

References

External links

2012-13
2012–13 in European rugby union leagues